San Michele Mondovì is a comune (municipality) in the Province of Cuneo in the Italian region Piedmont, located about  south of Turin and about  east of Cuneo.

San Michele Mondovì borders the following municipalities: Lesegno, Mombasiglio, Monasterolo Casotto, Niella Tanaro, Torre Mondovì, and Vicoforte.

Demographic evolution

References